Nikola Kalinic (born January 21, 1997) is a Canadian gridiron football tight end for the Indianapolis Colts of the National Football League (NFL). He has also played for the Hamilton Tiger-Cats of the Canadian Football League.

University career
Kalinic played U Sports football for the York Lions from 2015 to 2018. In his four years with the team, he had 38 catches for 416 yards and two touchdowns and was the first York football player to be named an OUA All-Star twice in one season (on offence and on special teams).

Professional career

Hamilton Tiger-Cats
Kalinic was drafted in the second round, tenth overall, by the Hamilton Tiger-Cats in the 2019 CFL Draft and he signed with the team on May 17, 2019. After making the team following training camp, he played in his first professional game on June 13, 2019 against the Saskatchewan Roughriders. In his second game, on June 22, 2019, against the Toronto Argonauts, he scored his first career CFL touchdown on his first career reception on a 31-yard pass from Jeremiah Masoli. Overall, Kalinic played in 16 regular season games for the Tiger-Cats in 2019 where he recorded 12 receptions for 106 yards and one touchdown. He played in his first career post-season game, against the Edmonton Eskimos, in the East Final win that sent the Tiger-Cats to the 107th Grey Cup. Kalinic played in his first Grey Cup game, but the Tiger-Cats lost to the Winnipeg Blue Bombers.

Due to the cancellation of the 2020 CFL season, Kalinic did not play in 2020. In 2021, he played in all 14 regular season games as he had 11 catches for 86 yards and one touchdown with eight special teams tackles. He also played in all three post-season games that year, including his second consecutive Grey Cup game where the Tiger-Cats again lost to the Blue Bombers in the 108th Grey Cup. He was scheduled to become a free agent in 2022, but was granted an early release on January 22, 2022, so that he could sign with a team in the National Football League.

Indianapolis Colts
Kalinic signed with the Indianapolis Colts of the National Football League. He was waived on August 30, 2022 and signed to the practice squad the next day. He was promoted to the active roster on December 13.

Personal life
Kalinic is of Serbian descent.

References

External links
 Hamilton Tiger-Cats bio
 York Lions bio

1997 births
Living people
Canadian football people from Toronto
Canadian football fullbacks
Hamilton Tiger-Cats players
York Lions football players
Players of Canadian football from Ontario
Canadian people of Serbian descent
Indianapolis Colts players